The Messengers is a 2007 supernatural horror film directed by the Pang Brothers, and produced by Sam Raimi. It stars Kristen Stewart, John Corbett, William B. Davis, Dylan McDermott, Carter Kolbeck and Penelope Ann Miller. The film is about an ominous darkness that invades a seemingly serene sunflower farm in North Dakota, and the Solomon family—the owners of the farm—who are torn apart by suspicion, mayhem, and murder.

The film was released on February 2, 2007, and the DVD was released on June 5, 2007. Filming took place in the Qu'Appelle Valley near the small community of Abernethy, Saskatchewan, Canada. The graphic novel adaptation was published in January 2007 by Dark Horse Comics, written by Jason Hall, and illustrated by Kelley Jones. The prequel, Messengers 2: The Scarecrow, was released in 2009.

Plot
A terrified mother and her young son are packing to flee when an unseen attacker kills the whole family.

Five years later, the Solomon family from Chicago moves into the house, near a small town in North Dakota. Roy Solomon hopes to start a sunflower farm. Everyone has issues: their teenage daughter, Jess, is unhappy about moving, their son Ben has been traumatized ever since a car accident when Jess drove while drunk with him as a toddler, and crashed the car. Seriously injured, Ben endures extensive treatment, recovering only to be mute. Their parents, Roy and Denise, don't trust their irresponsible daughter, and are broke from all the medical expenses. Roy believes moving to the farm will help heal the family.

Ominous events begin to occur. Flocks of crows are constantly swarming the home. Some attack Roy but are driven off by a drifter named John Burwell, whom Roy hires as a farmhand. Ben can see ghosts of the mother and the children. Jess sees a woman in the sunflower field. Jess follows her into the barn. She can hear the woman say "help me". Jess says "what do you want from me" as someone crawls across the floor behind her. Jess sees the little boy crying in the corner. She asks him what is wrong and gasps at the eerie sight of him. He jumps at her as she screams. She goes to the hospital and her parents think she is inflicting her own wounds. Roy and Denise argue and Jess runs away. Bobby picks her up and they ride into town.

Back at the house, a huge flock of crows circle the barn and fly at John attacking him. While Denise puts Ben to bed she sees a lady coming out of the wall.

Jess goes into town with Bobby to investigate the house's background. At a local store, she sees a newspaper clipping of the family, revealing the father to be none other than her dad's new farmhand. Burwell is actually John Rollins, the man who, in a fit of madness, murdered his entire family (as shown at the beginning of the film). Shocked, Jess and Bobby rush back home to warn her family. All of John's memories come rushing back and he sees Denise rushing to leave. He asks her "where are you going, Mary?", thinking she's his wife and attacks her. She runs into the cellar with Ben and slams the door. Bobby and Jess arrive looking for her mom and Ben when they get attacked by something unseen. John knocks Bobby out. Jess runs to the cellar finding Denise and Ben. Denise is sorry for not believing her about the ghosts. Jess makes it pitch black in the cellar as John knocks the door open, telling his family, "you are not leaving me". Roy gets home to find Bobby knocked out, asking him where are they. He goes into the cellar where John stabs him in the back with a pitch fork. After a struggle with Jess, she knocks John into the mud yelling, "we are not your family". John struggles to come up out of the mud as his dead family pulls him under. John grabs Jesse's leg and begins pulling her in. Roy grabs her hand and with Denise's help, pulls her out.
Alerted by Bobby, police and paramedics arrive shortly after. As her dad is put in the ambulance, he and Jess have a moment. Awhile after, everything returns to normal and their happiness is restored. The crows no longer attack, ghosts stop appearing, and Ben starts talking again.

Cast

Production

Ravens were used in the movie, not crows, however the characters say "crows" in the film. The production team could not obtain trained crows required for certain scenes.

The film began life as an original script called The Scarecrow by Todd Farmer. It was originally written as a psychological thriller as opposed to a more supernatural horror film. It was about a family on a farm suffering from financial problems and bad weather seasons. When the patriarch puts up a strange scarecrow out in the field, things start to change. But then people start to get killed, and the main character suspects the scarecrow. By the end, the main character is revealed actually to have caused the killings himself.

The script was sold to Revolution Studios. Director Patrick Lussier signed on to the film, and put a supernatural flair into the story. Revolution then brought in Stuart Beattie to rewrite the script. "What I pitched was 'the horror version of A Beautiful Mind,'" said Farmer, "and what they wanted was 'The Shining on a farm.'" Revolution then sold it to Ghost House Pictures, who then took it and hired Mark Wheaton to rewrite it. Impressed with his work on High Tension, producer Sam Raimi offered the film to Alexandre Aja. Aja passed on the film to direct The Hills Have Eyes. None of the original script survived through the rewrites, besides the farm setting, and character names.

The original Scarecrow script was finally used as the basis for the prequel, Messengers 2: The Scarecrow.

Release

Home media
The film was released on DVD and Blu-ray on June 5, 2007. Extras include an audio commentary and 7 making-of featurettes.

The film was re-issued on Blu-ray on November 6, 2012 by Mill Creek Entertainment. It was included in a double feature with Freedomland (2006), which made its Blu-ray debut in this release.

Reception

Box office
The Messengers placed first in box office receipts for the weekend of February 2–4, 2007. In its first weekend of release, the film grossed $14.7 million. The film grossed $55 million overall.

Critical response
  Audiences polled by CinemaScore gave the film an average grade of "C−" on an A+ to F scale.

Film critic Nigel Floyd wrote in Time Out, "many of the images feel over-familiar, and the shocks a mite too forced."  IGN Movies wrote in its review, "It's The Grudge on a farm," and concluded, "The problem with The Messengers is that it simply doesn't offer up much of anything new."  Lou Lumenick wrote in the New York Post that the films was "nicely photographed but slow-moving, dull, and utterly predictable."  Scott Tobias of The A.V. Club wrote that the film was "technically proficient enough to deliver the requisite jolts, but déjà vu haunts the film as surely as its pasty-faced, hitch-stepped ghoulies, and it's hard to shake the impression that we've seen this movie before."   Writing for the site Reel Views, James Berardinelli wrote that "The Messengers borrows so heavily from (other horror movies) that it has no room left for anything of its own.

Prequel
A prequel titled Messengers 2: The Scarecrow was released on July 21, 2009. The Rollins Family are the film's main characters. It stars Norman Reedus and Australian actress Claire Holt.

Comic  book
A comic version of the film was published by Dark Horse Comics in January 2007.

See also
List of ghost films

References

External links
 
 
 
 

2007 films
2007 horror films
2000s ghost films
2000s teen films
American ghost films
American haunted house films
American supernatural horror films
American teen horror films
Canadian supernatural horror films
English-language Canadian films
Fiction about familicide
Filicide in fiction
Films about dysfunctional families
Films set on farms
Films shot in Saskatchewan
Films set in North Dakota
Columbia Pictures films
Screen Gems films
Uxoricide in fiction
Films produced by Sam Raimi
Films with screenplays by Todd Farmer
2000s English-language films
2000s American films
2000s Canadian films